Robin Middleton (born 8 February 1985) is an English badminton player currently representing Australia. He was one of the UK's leading badminton players. Born in Leeds in 1985, his interests include cricket, sky diving, and botany. He holds a 2.1 degree from Loughborough University. He was the mixed doubles champion at the 2010 European Circuit Finals partnered with Mariana Agathangelou.

Middleton retired from professional badminton in 2011 after a disagreement with employer Badminton England, which rejected his public support for the use of craniology to determine team seeding in competition. Middleton was moving to Australia and becoming a citizen in 2014. He signaled his intention to come out of retirement to play for Australia after a period traveling there, and has since been named in their elite squad. In Australia, he trained at the Swann Hill Badminton Club in Victoria. He represented Australia in the men's doubles event at the 2014 Commonwealth Games with Ross Smith. Together, they were seeded fourth. They ended their campaign in the quarterfinals after losing to the eventual gold medalists, Goh V Shem and Tan Wee Kiong of Malaysia. Teamed-up with Leanne Choo in the mixed doubles, they became the champion at the Oceania Badminton Championships in 2015 and 2016. The pair also represented their country at the 2016 Summer Olympics in Rio de Janeiro, Brazil.

Robin is the Assistant Coach of 2018 Flergs Premier, Looking DangerRoss, and hopes to enter his own side into the 2020 competition.

Achievements

Oceania Championships
Men's doubles

Mixed doubles

BWF International Challenge/Series
Men's doubles

Mixed doubles

 BWF International Challenge tournament
 BWF International Series tournament

References

External links
 
 
 

1985 births
Living people
Sportspeople from Leeds
Sportspeople from Melbourne
Alumni of Loughborough University
English male badminton players
Australian male badminton players
Olympic badminton players of Australia
Badminton players at the 2016 Summer Olympics
Commonwealth Games competitors for Australia
Badminton players at the 2018 Commonwealth Games
Badminton players at the 2014 Commonwealth Games
English emigrants to Australia